Dihydrofolic acid (conjugate base dihydrofolate) (DHF) is a folic acid (vitamin B9) derivative which is converted to tetrahydrofolic acid by dihydrofolate reductase. Since tetrahydrofolate is needed to make both purines and pyrimidines, which are building blocks of DNA and RNA, dihydrofolate reductase is targeted by various drugs to prevent nucleic acid synthesis.

Interactive pathway map

Further reading

References 

Folates